William Rockhill may refer to:

 William R. Rockhill (1793–1865), U.S. Representative from Indiana
 William Woodville Rockhill (1854–1914), U.S. diplomat

See also
 William Rockhill Nelson, grandson of William R. Rockhill